= Fasttest Shedder =

Nigerian reality television series

- Also known as: The faStest shedder
- Country of origin: Nigeria
- No. of seasons: 3

Original release
- Release: 2015 – 2020

The Fasttest Shedder (stylized as the faSttest shedder) is a reality television series, that is centered around fighting obesity in Nigeria. The show was created in Nigeria in 2015. Contestants are camped together for a certain number of weeks and are supported and monitored under conditions that include daily exercise of their body, healthy eating habits, nutritional coaching, mental tasks, and entertainment to help them lose their weight to stay fit for a period of three months. The program is usually broadcast to several television channels across the Nation.

The Show is Hosted by Bella-Rose Okojie.

== Memorable moments ==
The first edition of The faSttest shedder took place in 2015, with ten Nigerians competing to lose the least amount of weight possible. . Its founder, Seyi Olusore stated in an interview that it is Nigeria's first ever weight loss reality TV show. By 2020, the show had secured a large sponsorship from Three Crowns Milk and had grown to include more contestants as well as increased television sponsorship.

The Show is presently in its Third Season.

== List of winners ==
Year	Winner
2015	Tolani
2019	Ada Onwubuya
2020	Yetunde Bajomo
